Sri Lanka is home to 21 endemic mammals. Number of terrestrial mammals that have been recorded from the country is 91. Additionally there are 28 marine mammals in the oceans surrounding the island. Being an island Sri Lanka lacks land area to supports large animals. However fossil evidence of large archaic species of rhinoceroses, hippopotamuses, and lions have been discovered. The flora and fauna of Sri Lanka is mostly 
understudied. Therefore, the number of endemics could be underestimated. All three endemic genera Solisorex, Feroculus and Srilankamys, of Sri Lanka are monotypic.

The endemic status of two Sri Lankan shrews has undergone changes as they have been reported in India recently. The Kelaart's long-clawed shrew (Feroculus feroculus) and the Sri Lanka highland shrew (Suncus montanus) were recorded from southern India. At the same time taxonomic revisions have indicated that the flame-striped jungle squirrel (Funambulus layardi), the red slender loris (Loris tardigradus) and two species of mouse deer, Moschiola meminna and M. kathygre are endemic to Sri Lanka. That leaves the number of endemic mammals in Sri Lanka at 16. Meanwhile, a group of researchers have described a new shrew species Crocidura hikmiya from the Sinharaja Forest Reserve in 2007. The discovery leads to increase the ultimate number of endemics to 21 at present.

For Sri Lanka, small mammals are of special importance as they constitute a notable portion of the mammalian fauna of the country. Of the 91 species of mammals. recorded in the country, 31 are rodents and shrews. Furthermore, they are also of significant importance in biological point of view, as they make up largely to the country's endemic faunal component. The endemic small mammals include six rodents and four shrews. Many of these endemic species are found in fragmented rainforests in southwestern Sri Lanka which are highly vulnerable to habitat destruction. As a result, many of these species have been categorised as threatened or endangered at national level.

Endemic mammals
Most endemic mammals are small nocturnal mammals that are seen rarely.

Order Primate: primates

Order Rodentia: rodents

Order Soricomorpha: shrews and moles

Order Carnivora: carnivorans

Order Artiodactyla: even-toed ungulates

References

 02
.Mammals
Mammals, endemic
Sri Lanka
Sri Lanka 02